The following is a list of rugby league players who have made 100 or more appearances for Salford Red Devils since they joined the Northern Union in 1896. Appearances include all official league and cup games, but exclude friendlies. The list is ordered by surname, and then by first name.

Players

Notes

References

External links
HERITAGE LIST

 
Salford Red Devils players